Mount Lantoy is a  mountain located  inland from the municipality of Argao, Cebu in the Philippines.

Watershed forest reserve
Mt. Lantoy was declared as a watershed forest reserve by virtue of Presidential Proclamation No. 414 on June 29, 1994.

In Philippine mythology
In Philippine mythology, Mount Lantoy is said to be the domain of Maria Cacao, a diwata who lives in a cave in the mountain. Outside her cave grow numerous cacao trees, which are said to be her plantation. After harvest time come rains that wash down the mountain, enabling Maria Cacao to float down to the towns below in her golden ship to sell her products.

The original name of the Maria Cacao is unknown as it was not recorded before the Spanish subjugated her name in a bid to instill Roman Catholicism to the natives. But it is widely assumed her name is not indigenous as 'Cacao' is an imported term that came from Latin America when the Spanish arrived. Additionally, the term 'Maria' was added by the Spanish to turn her into 'Catholic', in a bid to widen Spanish rule in southern Cebu.

References

Mountains of the Philippines
Landforms of Cebu